The Virgin Islands Official Gazette is the government gazette of the British Virgin Islands.

The Gazette has been published in Tortola since 9 March 1967 under the provisions of Section 2 of the Interpretation and General Clauses Act 1955. It replaced The Antigua, Montserrat and Virgin Islands Official Gazette which was published in Antigua for the then West Indies Federation.

See also
List of British colonial gazettes

References

External links
Official website

British colonial gazettes
Government of the British Virgin Islands
Official Gazette
1967 establishments in the British Virgin Islands
Publications established in 1967
Tortola